Collins Siding was a railway siding on the Walhalla narrow gauge line in Gippsland, Victoria, Australia. The siding opened in 1918; it served as a junction with the Forests Commission timber tramway which served the Tyers Valley.

References

Disused railway stations in Victoria (Australia)
Transport in Gippsland (region)
Shire of Baw Baw
Walhalla railway line